The Old Grodno Castle (also known as the Grodno Upper Castle and Bathory's Castle) originated in the 11th century as the seat of a dynasty of Black Ruthenian rulers, descended from a younger son of Yaroslav the Wise of Kiev.

History

Construction 
The first wooden castle was built in the 11th century at the confluence of the Neman and the Gorodnichanka rivers.

The 13th-century keep of the castle belonged to a type of Belarusian defensive tower represented by the Tower of Kamyanyets. Vytautas the Great rebuilt the castle in stone and added five Brick Gothic towers in 1391–98, transforming it into one of his main residences. Casimir IV Jagiellon also favoured Grodno over Lithuania's official capital. It was there that the Polish Crown was offered to him, and it was there that he died in 1492.

The next notable tenant of the castle was Stephen Báthory who envisaged Grodno as the capital of his vast empire in Eastern Europe. He engaged Scotto of Parma to replace the Vytautas Castle with his own residence in the advanced Renaissance taste of Northern Italy. After Bathory's death in Grodno in 1586, his pet project was abandoned. The citadel was devastated by the Russians during a Russo-Polish War in 1655.

Reconstruction 

The castle's revival took place in 1673-78 due to Krzysztof Zygmunt Pac who raised sufficient funds to finance the refurbishing of the royal residence. The restored castle was selected by King Michał Korybut Wiśniowiecki of Poland as the location for every third Sejm of the Polish–Lithuanian Commonwealth. The castle suffered extensive damage during the Great Northern War, forcing the royal court to move into the New Grodno Castle.

After the partitions of Poland the castle was given over to the Russian army and housed a barracks. The authorities of interwar Poland restored the chamber of the ambassadors and the Sejm Hall.

XX-XXI centuries 
At present the castle serves as a historical and archaeological museum with a collection of more than 200,000 artifacts, one of the largest in Belarus.

The newest reconstruction began in 2017.

The restoration of the Old Grodno Castle was criticized due to the lacking of historical authenticity. For instance, the contemporary viewpoint was added near the central gates. Some specialists disputed the restoration project, they found significant mistakes in documentation that appeared because the constructor couldn’t read historical inventory descriptions written in Polish and German. For example, the shape of the dome above the central tower, added levels between towers and galleries. Some authentic 16th century walls were demolished.

References

Literature 
 Ф. Д. Гуревич. "Древности Белорусского Понеманья". Ленинград, Изд-во Академии наук СССР, 1962.

External links
 Virtual Tour of The Old Grodno Castle
 The Old Grodno Castle Official Website
 Restoration process, 2019
 Video report about the reconstruction (in Russian)

Buildings and structures in Grodno Region
Castles in Belarus
Castles of the Grand Duchy of Lithuania
Residences of Polish monarchs
Royal residences in Belarus
Tourist attractions in Grodno Region
11th-century establishments in Europe
Buildings and structures completed in the 11th century